The back and forward lakes Stubensee (lit. Lake Stuben in German) are located 2,423 m above sea level in the back part of the Pflersch valley, which is a left side valley of the Eisacktal. Similar to the Grünsee, one has to go by car until Ochsenalm (an alpine pasture) and then travel northwards high up route 6 until the lakes are reached after about four kilometers. At the forward lake, there is a snack station called Magdeburger Hütte (German for Magdeburg alpine refuge), which is named after the city in Germany.

Both lakes have a very good water quality (A grade). As typical mountain lakes, the water remains refreshingly chilly even on hot summer days at max. 12° Celsius. While the back lake is only supplied by rain or melting snow, the forward one is supplied and drained by the Hochtalbach (A grade quality / rapid). The creek has a length of about 1.65 kilometers and belongs to the source rivers of the Fernerbach. Both merge near the Ochsenalm. Both lakes give also a protected, untouched living space to trouts and carps.

References 

Lakes of South Tyrol